The 1949 Pepperdine Waves football team represented George Pepperdine College as an independent during the 1949 college football season. The team was led by first-year head coach Ray Richards. For the 1949 season, the Waves moved home games back to Sentinel Field on the campus of Inglewood High School in Inglewood, California. They had previously played at Sentinel Field in 1946 and 1947. Pepperdine finished the season with a record of 4–5. They joined the California Collegiate Athletic Association (CCAA) in 1950.

Schedule

Team players in the NFL
The following player finished his career at Pepperdine in 1949 then served in the military for two years before being selected in the 1952 NFL Draft.

Notes

References

Pepperdine
Pepperdine Waves football seasons
Pepperdine Waves football